The 1963–64 season was the 62nd season in which Dundee competed at a Scottish national level, playing in Division One, where the club would finish in 6th place. Dundee would also compete in both the Scottish Cup and the Scottish League Cup. They would be knocked out of the Quarter-finals of the League Cup by Hibernian, and made it to the final of the Scottish Cup, where they lost Rangers. They would also compete in the revamped Summer Cup, being knocked out in the group stages.

Striker Alan Gilzean would break the club record for most goals in a single season, scoring 52 times in 48 appearances.

Scottish Division One 

Statistics provided by Dee Archive.

League table

Scottish League Cup 

Statistics provided by Dee Archive.

Group 3

Group 3 table

Knockout stage

Scottish Cup 

Statistics provided by Dee Archive.

Summer Cup 

Statistics provided by Dee Archive.

Group 2

Group table

Player Statistics 
Statistics provided by Dee Archive

|}

See also 

 List of Dundee F.C. seasons

References

External links 

 1963-64 Dundee season on Fitbastats

Dundee F.C. seasons
Dundee